Sparsitubus is a fungal genus in the family Polyporaceae. It is a monotypic genus, containing the single species Sparsitubus nelumbiformis, found in Hainan and Yunnan, China. Molecular analysis suggests that Sparsitubus is in a clade of white rot polypores and may be closely related to the Ganodermataceae.

References

Polyporaceae
Monotypic Polyporales genera
Fungi of China
Fungi described in 1980